Strophosoma is a genus of beetles belonging to the family Curculionidae.

The species of this genus are found in Europe and Northern America.

Species:
 Strophosoma albosignatum (Boheman, 1840) 
 Strophosoma alonsoi Pelletier, 1994

References

Curculionidae
Curculionidae genera